Black Hills Ambush is a 1952 American Western film directed by Harry Keller and starring Allan Lane, Leslie Banning and Eddy Waller.

Plot

Cast
 Allan Lane as Rocky Lane 
 Black Jack as Black Jack  
 Eddy Waller as Nugget Clark  
 Leslie Banning as Sally  
 Roy Barcroft as Henchman Bart  
 Michael Hall as Larry Stewart  
 John Vosper as Gaines 
 Ed Cassidy as Sheriff  
 John L. Cason as Henchman Jake  
 Wes Hudman as Wagon Driver  
 Michael Barton as Clay Stewart 
 Art Dillard as 2nd Wagon Driver

References

Bibliography
 Bernard A. Drew. Motion Picture Series and Sequels: A Reference Guide. Routledge, 2013.

External links
 

1952 films
1952 Western (genre) films
American Western (genre) films
American black-and-white films
Films directed by Harry Keller
Republic Pictures films
1950s English-language films
1950s American films